Valeri Vitalyevich Shushlyakov (born 13 July 1966 in Oryol) is a former Russian football player.

References

1966 births
Sportspeople from Oryol
Living people
Soviet footballers
FC Oryol players
FC Aktobe players
Navbahor Namangan players
Russian footballers
FC Ural Yekaterinburg players
Russian Premier League players
Russian expatriate footballers
Expatriate footballers in Hungary
FC Baltika Kaliningrad players
FC Kuban Krasnodar players
FC Volgar Astrakhan players
FC Kristall Smolensk players
Association football midfielders
Association football forwards
FC Spartak Nizhny Novgorod players